Oakland is an unincorporated community in Oakland Township, Franklin County, Iowa, United States.

References

Unincorporated communities in Franklin County, Iowa
Unincorporated communities in Iowa